This is a list of current Chief Justices of the Supreme Court and High Courts of India, the highest court in every state of the Republic of India. There are currently 25 High Courts in the country with seven of them having multiple jurisdictions.

Supreme Court

High Courts

See also 

 List of current Indian governors
 List of current Indian chief ministers
 List of current Indian legislative speakers and chairpersons
 List of current Indian opposition leaders
 List of chief justices of India
 List of sitting judges of the Supreme Court of India
 List of sitting judges of High Courts of India

References

 
Lists of Indian judges